Undercover Christmas is a 2003 American Canadian romantic comedy-drama television film directed by Nadia Tass and starring Jami Gertz, Tyne Daly, Shawn Christian, Winston Rekert, and Cameron Bancroft.

Plot summary
Jake Cunningham (Shawn Christian) is an uptight FBI agent assigned to protect Brandi O'Neill (Jami Gertz), a lower-class cocktail waitress who recently helped with the tax fraud investigation of her billionaire boyfriend. When Jake's wealthy parents (Tyne Daly and Winston Rekert) unexpectedly call him home for the holidays, Jake must bring Brandi with him in order to keep her safe prior to the trial. They pose as a couple in order to keep the proceedings a secret until the court date. The Cunninghams disapprove of the match but begin to accept Jake's "girlfriend" just as Jake and Brandi are truly becoming a couple. Brandi testifies against her former boyfriend. Brandi introduces Jake, her new love, to her mother.

Cast
 Jami Gertz – Brandi O'Neil
 Shawn Christian – Jake Cunningham
 Tyne Daly – Anne Cunningham
 Winston Rekert – Joe Cunningham
 Anne Hawthorne – Stefanie Cunningham
 Cameron Bancroft – Scott Shift
 Alexandra Harvey – Ashley Cunningham

See also
 List of Christmas films

External links

2003 television films
2003 films
2003 romantic comedy-drama films
American Christmas comedy-drama films
American romantic comedy-drama films
American television films
Canadian Christmas comedy-drama films
Canadian romantic comedy-drama films
Canadian drama television films
English-language Canadian films
Films about the Federal Bureau of Investigation
Films directed by Nadia Tass
Christmas television films
2000s Christmas comedy-drama films
2000s American films
2000s Canadian films